This is a list of General Conventions of the Episcopal Church, which are held every three years.

List of Conventions

Sources 
Bob N. Wallace, The General Convention of the Episcopal Church (New York: Seabury Press, 1976)

External links 

 Journals of General Conventions of the Protestant Episcopal Church, in the United States, 1785–1835 at Internet ArchiveVolume 1: 1785–1821; Volume 2: 1823–1835; and Volume 3: Historical notes and documents

Episcopal Church (United States)
General Conventions of the Episcopal Church
Christian conferences